Mark Turner (born 23 October 1984) is an English cricketer who most recently played for Derbyshire. He is a right-handed batsman and right-arm medium-fast bowler.

Career

Turner played for England Under-19s in 2003 and 2004, taking 9–104 against Bangladesh at Taunton in 2004. He made his first-class debut for Durham in 2005 but made just 3 first-class appearances for them in 2005 and 2006 combined. He moved to Somerset where he acted as an understudy to the senior bowlers and made his maiden first-class fifty against Derbyshire in the 2007 season.

In September 2010, it was announced that he would join Derbyshire in 2011. At the end of the 2014 season, Turner was released by Derbyshire having spent part of the season on loan at Northamptonshire.

He was known for his aggressive fast bowling in the Twenty20 form of the game, and being able to bowl at a similar pace off both a short and full-length run-up. He was also known to stutter his run-up, then suddenly start again – similar to a footballer stuttering in the run-up to a penalty kick. In the four day format of the game, he was a more conservative bowler, sometimes acting as a workhorse – bowling in good areas, at a constant pace, for long periods. He was also an accomplished fielder.

References

External links

Somerset cricketers
Durham cricketers
Derbyshire cricketers
English cricketers
1984 births
Living people
Cricketers from Sunderland